John Bryden (19272012) was a Scottish curler. He competed in four World Championships, winning the gold medal in 1967.

Curling career 
He played third on Chuck Hay's team out of the Kilgraston & Moncrieffe Curling Club in Perth, Scotland during a very successful run in the 1960s. In the span of six years the team won the Scottish Men's Championship five times, earning them the right to represent Scotland at the World Curling Championships in those years. At World's in 1963, 1966, and 1968 Glen's team took home the silver medal, with Canada winning the Championship each of those years. At the 1967 World Men's Championship they defeated Team Sweden, skipped by Bob Woods, in the final to win Scotland's first World Men's Championship.

In the 1980s Bryden returned to competitive curling on Bill Muirhead's senior men's team, winning the Scottish Senior Curling Championships five years in a row.

Personal life
Bryden worked as a farmer in Perthshire.

Teams

References

External links 
 

1927 births
2012 deaths
Scottish male curlers
World curling champions
Scottish curling champions
20th-century Scottish farmers
People from Perthshire
21st-century farmers